KTOO (104.3 FM) is a non-commercial educational radio station licensed to serve Juneau, Alaska, United States.  The station is owned by KTOO Public Media. It is the radio sister to KTOO-TV, a PBS satellite member station of KAKM.

The station airs public radio programming from NPR.

KTOO also operates KTOO 360TV, a statewide public television service. Programming included Gavel Alaska, the state's legislative and public affairs coverage, and First Nations Experience programming.

KTOO operates two other radio stations, KXLL 100.7 FM and KRNN 102.7 FM. All three are members of the regional organization CoastAlaska and the Alaska Public Radio Network.

All stations share a broadcasting complex in downtown Juneau at 360 Egan Drive.

Translators
KTOO programming is also carried on broadcast translator stations to extend or improve the coverage area of the primary station.

External links
KTOO official website
Listen Live

TOO
NPR member stations
Community radio stations in the United States
TOO
Radio stations established in 1963
1963 establishments in Alaska